Iracema is a 1949 Brazilian historical drama film directed by Vittorio Cardineli and Gino Talamo and starring Ilka Soares, Mário Brasini and Luís Tito. The film is an adaptation of José de Alencar's 1865 novel of the same title. The story is set against the early contacts between European and Native Americans in what became Brazil.

Cast
 Ilka Soares as Iracema  
 Mário Brasini as Martins  
 Luís Tito as Poty  
 Nicolai Jartulary as Irapuã  
 Carlos Machado as Araken 
 Coaracy Pereira as Iracema's son

References

Citations

Bibliography

External links

1940s historical drama films
1949 films
Brazilian historical drama films
Films directed by Gino Talamo
1940s Portuguese-language films
Films based on Brazilian novels
Films set in the 16th century
Brazilian black-and-white films
1949 drama films